Kabillion is a children's video-on-demand service owned by Splash Entertainment. Launched on January 7, 2007, Kabillion is available both as a free VOD channel currently available on Comcast, Spectrum, Charter Communications, Altice USA, Cox Communications, Verizon Fios, AT&T U-verse, Frontier FiberOptic, Dish Network, and Optimum West digital cable systems across the United States, and as an OTT Network available on Sling TV, Roku, Amazon Fire TV, and Apple TV.  Its headquarters are in Los Angeles, California.

The service is divided into two distinct services, Kabillion, which features general audience programming, and Kabillion Girls Rule, which mainly features programming for both young girls and preschoolers. While these services do carry programs from Splash Entertainment's catalog (formerly a part of MoonScoop Group), they also carry programs from various other outside production companies. Most notably, the Mexican-animated show El Chavo Animado made its English-language debut on Kabilion. Also, on April 29, 2013, Kabillion entered a partnership with Saban Brands to add programming from The CW's Saturday-morning Vortexx block to the existing Kabillion service. Even with the discontinuance of Vortexx (the last conclusive Saturday-morning block without a strictly E/I-based lineup on broadcast television) on September 27, 2014, a few shows from the block like Transformers Prime and Sonic X still remain on Kabillion.

Kabillion also has several online presences. The company has been on YouTube  since February 13, 2007. In July 2016, Kabillion partnered with Xumo to add VOD content to the service as well as a 24-hour live Kabilion channel. In August 2018, in a partnership with Amazon, Kabillion launched its current online merchandise store. In April 2019, Kabillion branched out on to Twitch, with its streams centered around live interviews with members of the animation industry as well as some episodic binge streams of its series.

Includes a variety of licensed titles. Some of them were productions by the now-defunct MoonScoop.

Current programming

Upcoming programming

Former programming

References

External links

Internet television channels
Children's television networks in the United States
Television channels and stations established in 2007
English-language television stations in the United States
Preschool education television networks